Apocheima is a genus of moths in the family Geometridae erected by Jacob Hübner in 1825, also known as Phigalia.

Species
 Apocheima cinerarium (Erschoff, 1874)
 Apocheima denticulata (Hulst, 1900)
 Apocheima djakonovi (Moltrecht, 1933)
 Apocheima hispidaria (Denis & Schiffermüller, 1775) – small brindled beauty
 Apocheima owadai Nakajima, 1994
 Apocheima pilosaria (Denis & Schiffermüller, 1775) – pale brindled beauty
 Apocheima plumogeraria (Hulst, 1888)
 Apocheima strigataria (Minot, 1869)
 Apocheima titea (Cramer, 1780)
 Apocheima verecundaria Leech, 1897

References
 

Bistonini
Geometridae genera